Maria Mączyńska (born 22 May 1932) is a retired Polish archer. She won the world championships in 1967, both individually and in team competition, and finished in sixth place at the 1972 Summer Olympics, when archery was reintroduced to the Olympic Games.

After graduating in economics in Krakow in 1951 she had a long career in archery, spanning from 1953 to 1979, followed by coaching work. Besides the world allround title in 1967, she was six time national allround champion and won six world titles in individual archery disciplines.

She married Stanisław, an engineer, and changed her last name to Cugowska. They have a son Jacek (b. 1963), a painter, and live in Warsaw.

References

1932 births
Living people
Olympic archers of Poland
Archers at the 1972 Summer Olympics
Polish female archers
People from Kazimierza County
Sportspeople from Świętokrzyskie Voivodeship